CAPE-2 (Cajun Advanced Picosatellite Experiment 2), or Louisiana-OSCAR 75, was an American amateur miniaturized satellite developed by students at the University of Louisiana at Lafayette.

Background 
The purpose of CAPE 2 is to gather data while orbiting in space and transmit this data to the ground station on the University of Louisiana at Lafayette campus. The team of engineering students runs experiments and maintain the satellite while in orbit.

As part of NASA's Educational Launch of Nanosatellites (ELaNa) educational launch of nanosatellites program, CAPE-2 was launched with the following payloads: a Voice Repeater, Text to Speech, Tweeting, Digipeater, File Storage and Transfers, and DTMF Query.

Status
On October 23, 2014, the CAPE-2 satellite re-entered the atmosphere.

See also 

List of CubeSats
CAPE-1

References

External links
 

University of Louisiana at Lafayette
Student satellites
Spacecraft launched in 2013
CubeSats
Amateur radio satellites
Spacecraft launched by Minotaur rockets